John Callum is a New Hampshire politician.

Early life
Callum graduated from Stevens High School. He served in the United States Navy from 1962 to 1966.

Political career
On November 6, 2018, Callum was elected to the New Hampshire House of Representatives where he represents the Sullivan 6 district. Callum assumed office on December 4, 2018. Callum is a Republican.

Personal life
Callum resides in Unity, New Hampshire. Callum has three children and four grandchildren.

References

Living people
People from Unity, New Hampshire
United States Navy sailors
Republican Party members of the New Hampshire House of Representatives
21st-century American politicians
Year of birth missing (living people)